Lenka Ptáčníková (born 16 January 1976) is a Czech-born Icelandic chess player who holds the title of Woman Grandmaster. She won twice the Czech women's chess championship, in 1994 and 1996, and fourteen times, to date, the Icelandic women's chess championship.

She transferred to the Icelandic Chess Federation in 2004.

She won the women's Nordic Chess Championship in 2005 and 2017.

She played for Czech Republic at the Women's Chess Olympiads of 1994, 1996, 1998, 2000, 2002 and at the Mitropa Cup in 1997. Ptáčníková has represented Iceland at the Women's Chess Olympiad in 2004, 2006, 2008, 2010, 2012, 2014 and the Women's European Team Chess Championship in 2005 and 2013.

References

External links

1976 births
Living people
Chess woman grandmasters
Icelandic female chess players
Czech female chess players